Tachosa fumata is a moth of the family Erebidae first described by Hans Daniel Johan Wallengren in 1860. It is found in Angola, Burkina Faso, the Democratic Republic of the Congo (Katanga, Orientale), Ethiopia, Kenya, Mauritania, Namibia, South Africa, Tanzania, Uganda and Zimbabwe.

References

Moths described in 1860
Tachosa
Moths of Africa